Lambdotherium ("wave beast") is a genus of North American brontothere.

Brontotheres
Eocene odd-toed ungulates
Eocene mammals of North America

References